The Hollywood Reporter is a 1926 American silent crime drama film directed by Bruce Mitchell and starring Frank Merrill, Peggy Montgomery and Charles K. French.

Synopsis
Corrupt city boss Hymie During, running for election, tries to gain the support of the editor of the Hollywood Morning Express by blackmailing him over time he had once served in prison. The editor gets his top reporter Billy Hudson, who is in love with his daughter, to try and dig up evidence against During.

Cast
 Frank Merrill as Billy Hudson
 Charles K. French as Basil Manning
 Peggy Montgomery as	Lois Manning
 William T. Hayes as 	Dell Crossley 
 Jack Richardson as Hymie During
 Violet Schram as 	Margaret Latham

References

Bibliography
 Connelly, Robert B. The Silents: Silent Feature Films, 1910-36, Volume 40, Issue 2. December Press, 1998.
 Munden, Kenneth White. The American Film Institute Catalog of Motion Pictures Produced in the United States, Part 1. University of California Press, 1997.

External links
 

1926 films
1926 crime films
American silent feature films
American crime films
American black-and-white films
Films directed by Bruce M. Mitchell
1920s English-language films
1920s American films